John Herman Randall Jr. (February 14, 1899 – December 1, 1980) was an American philosopher, New Thought author, and educator.

Life
Born in Grand Rapids, Michigan, the son of a Baptist minister, he graduated from Morris High School in New York City and obtained his A.B. from Columbia University in 1918. He obtained an A.M. the following year and a PhD in 1922.

He married Mercedes Irene Moritz in New York on December 23, 1922, with whom he had two sons, John Herman Randall III and Francis Ballard Randall.

He started working as an assistant professor of philosophy at Columbia in 1925. He was a member of the American Philosophical Association, the Ethical Culture Society, Alpha Delta Phi and Phi Beta Kappa. He served as president of the Metaphysical Society of America in 1967. For fifteen years at Columbia University, he served as the Chair of the University Seminar on The Renaissance which he co-founded with Paul Oskar Kristeller.

He published The Problem of Group Responsibility in 1922 and The Making of the Modern Mind in 1926. He also coauthored The Introduction to Contemporary Civilization and wrote an influential study of Aristotle, entitled simply Aristotle. Some of his other books include Nature and Historical Experience, a collection of essays on metaphysics and the philosophy of history, How Philosophy Uses Its Past, The Role of Knowledge in Western Religion, Plato: Dramatist of the Life of Reason, Hellenistic Ways of Deliverance and the Making of the Christian Synthesis, and The Career of Philosophy, a three-volume history of philosophy from the Middle Ages through the twentieth century. He was one of signers of the Humanist Manifesto in 1933.

See also
 American philosophy
 List of American philosophers

References

External links
 http://aynrandlexicon.com/ayn-rand-works/aristotle.html (Audio of Ayn Rand reading her review of Randall's book Aristotle)
 http://www.pragmatism.org/genealogy/randall.htm
 Finding Aid to the John Herman Randall Papers at Columbia University.
 http://www.britannica.com/eb/article-9062652/John-Herman-Randall-Jr (requires registration)

20th-century American philosophers
1899 births
1980 deaths
New Thought writers
Presidents of the Metaphysical Society of America
Columbia College (New York) alumni
Columbia Graduate School of Arts and Sciences alumni